Ravena-Coeymans-Selkirk High School (technically Ravena-Coeymans-Selkirk Senior High School) is a small high school in Ravena, New York, about 9 miles south of Albany, New York on U.S. Route 9W.

It is known for its music; and it is located across the street from the Lafarge cement factory.

RCS has numerous clubs, including art, drama club, French, FBLA, key club, S.A.D.D, G.S.A, and Gaming club

Notable alumni
 Thomasina Winslow

See also
 Coeymans, New York
 Selkirk, New York

References

External links
 

Public high schools in Albany County, New York